The 20th annual Berlin International Film Festival was supposed to be held from 26 June to 7 July 1970. The festival opened with Klann – grand guignol by Patrick Ledoux. However, on 5 July the competition was cancelled and no major prizes were awarded, due to a controversy surrounding the participation of Michael Verhoeven's anti-war film o.k.

Jury
The following people were announced as being on the jury for the festival:
 George Stevens, director and screenwriter (United States) - Jury President
 Klaus Hebecker, journalist and film critic (West Germany)
 David Neves, director, screenwriter and producer (Brazil)
 Véra Volmane, journalist, writer and film critic (France)
 Billie Whitelaw, actress (United Kingdom)
 Alberto Lattuada, director and screenwriter (Italy)
 Dušan Makavejev, director and screenwriter (Yugoslavia)
 Gunnar Oldin, journalist and film critic (Sweden)
 Manfred Durniok, director and producer (West Germany)

Films in competition
The following films were in competition:

Controversy
During the screening of the film o.k.'', the film was interrupted. The jury, presided by American film director George Stevens, decided after a 7-2 vote to demand Berlinale director Alfred Bauer, who was present at the screening, to take the film out of the competition. The jury justified their decision by citing a FIAPF (International Federation of Film Producers Associations) guideline that said: "All film festivals should contribute to better understanding between nations". This accusation was based on the fact that the film reenacted the 1966 Incident on Hill 192 of the Vietnam War in the Bavarian forest depicting four American soldiers kidnapping, raping, stabbing and shooting a Vietnamese girl named Mao until she finally dies. A fifth soldier on the patrol refuses to take part in the attack on the girl and his report to his commander is buried in the files. Stevens, who had served during the Second World War, claimed that the film was anti-American. One jury member, Dušan Makavejev, protested against this measure, stood up for the film and supported director Michael Verhoeven and producer Rob Houwer. Bauer cited the Berlinale’s status as an "A" festival, which meant that an accepted film could not be excluded from the competition. This was followed by altercations between the leadership of the Berlinale and Stevens, and between the Berlin and international press. During a press conference, Verhoeven defended his film by stating in these terms: "I have not made an anti-American film. If I were an American, I would even say my film is pro‐American. The biggest part of the American people today is against the war in Vietnam". Other directors that were taking part in the festival withdrew their films in protest. The jury was accused of censorship and eventually disbanded, therefore no prizes were awarded and the competition was suspended.

See also
 1968 Cannes Film Festival

References

External links
20th Berlin International Film Festival 1970: Suspended Ceremony
1970 Berlin International Film Festival
Berlin International Film Festival:1970  at Internet Movie Database

20
1970 film festivals
1970 in West Germany
1970s in West Berlin